Deborah Gaye Van Valkenburgh (born August 29, 1952) is an American actress best known for her screen debut as Mercy in the 1979 cult film The Warriors, and her role as Jackie Rush for five seasons (1980–1985) on the television situation comedy Too Close for Comfort. In 2012, she won the Best Supporting Actress in a Fantasy Film award at the PollyGrind Underground Film Festival for the film Road to Hell.

Early life
Van Valkenburgh graduated from Shaker High School in Latham, New York in June 1970. She graduated from Pratt Institute in Brooklyn, New York, with a BFA in Painting & Drawing. She started her acting career on Broadway performing in "Hair". Deborah also appearing in Off-Broadway plays Honeybee, The Tempest, Six Characters in Search of an Author, Hay Fever, When Did You last See Your Mother?, Iolanthe, It Ain't Aardvark, and Minutemen.
Besides acting in many New York plays, she has acted in regional and touring company productions of Mooney's Kid Don't Cry, The Children's Hour, and A View From the Bridge. Van Valkenburgh has studied acting with William Esper and John Shea, ballet with Ballet Arts Carnegie Hall and modern dance with James Cunningham. She also studied puppet production with Jim Henson, voice with Kirk Nurock and Richard Green, and improvisation with Dan Richter.

Filmography

Film

Television

Broadway
 1977 Broadway revival of Hair, original cast

Video games

Awards and nominations

References

External links
 
 
 
 

1952 births
Actresses from New York (state)
American film actresses
American people of Dutch descent
American stage actresses
American television actresses
Living people
Actors from Schenectady, New York
20th-century American actresses
21st-century American actresses